Raynovskoye is a rural locality (a settlement) in Kopenkinskoye Rural Settlement, Rossoshansky District, Voronezh Oblast, Russia. The population was 212 as of 2010. There are 4 streets.

Geography 
Raynovskoye is located 28 km south of Rossosh (the district's administrative centre) by road. Voroshilovsky is the nearest rural locality.

References 

Rural localities in Rossoshansky District